This was the first edition of the tournament.

Nuria Llagostera Vives won in the final, defeating compatriot Lourdes Domínguez Lino 2–6, 6–0, 6–4 in the final.

Seeds

Draw

Finals

Top half

Bottom half

References 

 http://www.itftennis.com/procircuit/tournaments/women's-tournament/info.aspx?tournamentid=1100010115

2004 ITF Women's Circuit
ITF Jounieh Open